Aram Voskanyan (born 26 August 1975) is an Armenian retired football striker. He is the current manager of Armenian club Ararat Yerevan.

Career
Aram was also a member of the Armenia national team, and has participated in 10 international matches since his debut in a home 2006 World Cup qualification match against Romania on 17 November 2004.

Managerial
On 8 December 2015 he has appointed as Head coach of Armenia under-19 football team.

On 13 January 2022, Alashkert announced Voskanyan as their new Head Coach.

On 1 June 2022, Ararat Yerevan announced Voskanyan as their new Head Coach.

References

External links

Profile at ffa.am
 Aram Voskanyan at Footballdatabase

1975 births
Living people
People from Sevan, Armenia
Soviet footballers
Armenian footballers
Armenia international footballers
Armenian expatriate footballers
FC Urartu players
FC Ararat Yerevan players
Armenian expatriate sportspeople in Russia
FC Pyunik players
Armenian expatriate sportspeople in Kazakhstan
Armenian expatriate sportspeople in Uzbekistan
FC Mika players
FC Baltika Kaliningrad players
FC Kyzylzhar players
Expatriate footballers in Russia
Expatriate footballers in Kazakhstan
Expatriate footballers in Uzbekistan
Armenian Premier League players
Association football forwards
FC Lokomotiv Saint Petersburg players
Soviet Armenians